Prime Vision BV is a Dutch company that specializes in computer vision systems and robotics for the recognition, identification and automation of sorting processes for the postal, logistics and e-commerce markets.

Headquartered in Delft, the Netherlands, Prime Vision operates globally.

The company's shareholders include PostNL - the national mail delivery company in the Netherlands - and First Dutch Innovations (FDI).

History 
In 1956 what would become Prime Vision starts life as a research department of the PTT.

A few years later, in 1961, The High Yield Character Reader (HYCR), the core technology of Prime Vision, was invented. The HYCR has been developed for capturing hand written as well as machine printed text and has found a particular niche as the basis for secondary OCR engines. In this role, Prime Vision's HYCR-based systems complement other OCRs that have been principally designed for machine printed text. With the systems working in tandem the net read rate of letters, flats and parcels is boosted significantly. HYCR is now in use throughout the world and includes various language sets, including Hebrew, Chinese and Tamil.

In 2003 KPN Research (formerly known as PTT) was acquired by TNO Companies. Additional investments prepared the company for its first sales outside the Netherlands.

One year later, TNT (now known as PostNL) acquired 60% of the shares of Prime Vision from TNO. Additional investment led to an independent entity Prime Vision BV.

The majority of the TNO Companies shares are taken over in 2017 by First Dutch Innovations who became the new shareholder of Prime Vision.

Awards
Postal Technology International Award 2010 in category Automation Technology of the Year.

Postal Technology International Award 2015 in category Last Mile Delivery of the Year for Digital Mail Man.

Postal Technology International Award 2016 in category Sorting Centre Innovation of the Year for MMS Dynamic Mail Processing Solution.

Postal Technology International Award 2017 in category Sorting Centre Innovation of the Year for Projection Sorting.

Postal Technology International Award 2017 in category Supplier of the Year.

Logistica Award 2017 for Autonomous Sorting.

References

Companies based in South Holland
Technology companies established in 1956
Postal system of the Netherlands
Optical character recognition
Automatic identification and data capture
1956 establishments in the Netherlands